Winnie , is a 2017 South African biographical documentary film directed by Pascale Lamche and produced by Christoph Jörg and Steven Markovitz for Pumpernickel Films, Submarine Films, Big World Cinema.

The film deals with the life of Winnie Madikizela-Mandela and her tireless struggle to bring down Apartheid in South Africa. The film was screened as a part of the Human Rights Festival 2019. In the same year, Lamche won the award for the Best Director for International Documentary at Sundance Film Festival. It was also nominated at Africa Movie Academy Awards for Best Documentary.

Cast
 Winnie Madikizela-Mandela as self 
 Anné-Mariè Bezdrop – author of 'Winnie Mandela: A Life', as self
 Zindzi Mandela – daughter of Winnie Madikizela-Mandela and Nelson Mandela, as self
 Sophie Mokoena – political editor, South African Broadcasting Corporation, as self
 Norah Moahloli – resident of Brandfort, as self
 Anton Harber – former editor of the Weekly Mail, as self
 Dali Mpofu – lawyer, as self
 Vic McPherson – former security branch operative of South African Police, as self
 Niel Barnard – former head of South Africa's National Intelligence Service, as self
 Teboho Murdoch as self
 Nelson Mandela – (archive footage)
 George Bizos – lawyer, as self
 Henk Heslinga – former chief of police, as self
 Ishmael Semenya as self

International screening
The film has screened in several international film festivals and received positive critical reviews.

 USA – 22 January 2017	at Sundance Film Festival
 USA – 31 May 2017	at Seattle International Film Festival
 South Africa – 4 June 2017 at Encounters South African International Documentary Festival
 Australia – 11 June 2017 at Sydney Film Festival
 Italy – 15 June 2017 at Biografilm Festival
 Netherlands – 22 June 2017	
 Israel – 16 July 2017	at Jerusalem Film Festival
 Australia – 17 August 2017 at Melbourne International Film Festival
 Canada – 7 October 2017 at Vancouver International Film Festival
 Poland – 16 October 2017 at Warsaw Film Festival
 UK – 16 August 2018 at London Feminist Film Festival

References

External links
 
 Winnie on YouTube

2017 films
2017 drama films
2017 biographical drama films
English-language South African films
2010s English-language films